Astroblepus pholeter is a species of catfish of the family Astroblepidae. This cavefish is endemic to the Jumandi Cave in the Napo River basin in Ecuador.

References

Bibliography
Eschmeyer, William N., ed. 1998. Catalog of Fishes. Special Publication of the Center for Biodiversity Research and Information, num. 1, vol. 1–3. California Academy of Sciences. San Francisco, California, United States. 2905. .

Astroblepus
Fish described in 1962
Cave fish
Freshwater fish of Ecuador